George Grimes may refer to:

 George Grimes (American football) (1922–1971), NFL football player for the Detroit Lions
 George Grimes (English politician) (1605–1657), member of parliament and Royalist
 George Grimes (Queensland politician) (1835–1910), member of the Queensland Legislative Assembly
 George F. Grimes (1877–1929), businessman and political figure in Newfoundland